Showdown (1942) is the eleventh of seventeen animated Technicolor short films based upon the DC Comics character Superman. Produced by Famous Studios, the cartoon was originally released to theaters by Paramount Pictures on October 16, 1942.

Plot

The short starts off as a figure dressed as Superman is terrorising Metropolis with various robberies. He is actually a small time crook who is working for a big time gangster known as the Boss, who insults him any chance he gets. Every paper in the city runs the story that Superman has gone bad, but Lois Lane does not believe it to be true. As she and Clark Kent read the story at the Daily Planet, an office boy informs them that the editor, Perry White, wants them to cover the opera and gives them two tickets.

At the opera, the Superman imposter sneaks from booth to booth, swiping people's jewelry without them noticing. When one woman cries out in alarm, Lois leaves her seat and walks out into the hallway, confronting the imposter. After a brief struggle, Lois rips the "S" patch off the imposter's chest, and he runs away. Not having seen his face in the darkness, Lois is convinced that Superman has really been responsible for all the crimes. As Lois calls the police, Clark exits the booth to follow after the imposter.

Cracking the door open slightly on the roof and noticing the imposter, Clark says, "My double is in for some trouble".  Seeing the police cars gather on the street below, the imposter heads back toward the door to the stairwell, where he is confronted by the real Superman. The imposter fires several rounds at Superman, to no avail. He claims his Boss made him do it. Without noticing, the imposter reaches the edge of the rooftop and falls over the edge. Superman swoops down to save him just in time. In the glow of the search lights, Lois and the police realize that the real Superman is not the criminal.

Hoping for a lighter punishment, the imposter agrees to take Superman to his boss. Superman, without saying a thing, stands in front of the boss' desk. After several moments, the boss tries to hit him with a golf club, then raises a lamp and sees Superman's face, prompting him to press a hidden button that opens a trap door and sends Superman falling into a pit. After the trap door closes, the boss and the imposter push the desk over the door and hide in a vault. Superman breaks out and opens the vault, tearing out electrified bars, only to find that the two have used a welding torch to cut a hole in the wall and escape. A police car is headed around a bend, unknowing that the criminals are coming at them from the other side. Just in time, Superman steps in and stops the cars from crashing, and grabs the two criminals by their collars. Upset at getting caught, the imposter tells his boss, "Next time, you play Superman!" Superman then leaves the two criminals for the police to handle.

Back at the Daily Planet, Clark is dozing off when Lois returns from the crime scene to start work on the story. Clark tells her that he was dreaming he was Superman. Lois responds by saying, "A fine Superman you'd make". Clark replies "Well, I can dream, can't I?"

Voice cast
 Bud Collyer as Clark Kent / Superman (uncredited)
 Joan Alexander as Lois Lane (uncredited)
 Jack Mercer as Jimmy Olsen (uncredited)
 Carl Meyer as the Superman impostor (uncredited)
 Jackson Beck as The Boss (uncredited)
 Julian Noa as Narrator (uncredited)

References

External links
 
 Showdown at the Internet Archive
 Showdown at the Internet Movie Database

1942 films
1942 animated films
1940s American animated films
1940s animated short films
1940s animated superhero films
Superman animated shorts
Films directed by Isadore Sparber
Paramount Pictures short films